Bridgeport is an elevated station on the Canada Line of Metro Vancouver's SkyTrain rapid transit system. It is located in Richmond, British Columbia, Canada, south of Vancouver. The Canada Line branches outbound at this station, with one branch heading westward to YVR–Airport station at the Vancouver International Airport and the other heading south to Richmond–Brighouse station in the commercial centre of Richmond.

Location
Bridgeport station is located near the intersection of River Road and Great Canadian Way—north of Bridgeport Road and in the same general area as the River Rock Casino—and is the northernmost SkyTrain station in Richmond. The Canada Line's Operations and Maintenance Centre is located northeast of the station. There is a large park-and-ride facility adjacent to the station. The City of Richmond anticipates that the area surrounding this station will be heavily redeveloped, and proposals include the building of office suites, hotels and a bike parkade.

Station information

Station layout

Services
The Canada Line splits at the flying junction just southwest of Bridgeport station, with the main line continuing southward through Richmond to its terminus at Richmond–Brighouse station. A branch line heads westward across Sea Island to YVR–Airport station at the Vancouver International Airport. Passengers traveling between Richmond and Sea Island must transfer at Bridgeport to complete their journey. The station also serves local Richmond bus routes and is the inbound terminus for express buses from Delta, White Rock and the 620 bus from the Tsawwassen ferry terminal. In the past, prior to the opening of the Canada Line, the express buses coming from Delta and White Rock continued to Downtown Vancouver. This station occasionally serves as the inbound terminus for some Canada Line trains from Richmond–Brighouse and YVR–Airport during weekdays.

Bus bay assignments:

Gallery

References

External links
 

Canada Line stations
Railway stations in Canada opened in 2009
Buildings and structures in Richmond, British Columbia
2009 establishments in British Columbia